The flathead guitarfish or Pacific guitarfish (Rhinobatos planiceps) is a species of fish in the Rhinobatidae family. It is found in Chile, Ecuador, Peru, and possibly Nicaragua. Its natural habitats are open seas and shallow seas.

Sources

flathead guitarfish
Fish of the Pacific Ocean
Western South American coastal fauna
flathead guitarfish
Taxonomy articles created by Polbot
Taxobox binomials not recognized by IUCN